The Cappella Demidoff di San Donato, or Demidoff Chapel of San Donato, is occupied at present by the Church of Christ in Florence, and is found on via San Donato. The church was formerly the private chapel of the Villa San Donato, built by the rich Russian noble, Anatoly Nikolaievich Demidov, 1st Prince of San Donato. It belonged to the  Russian Orthodox Church. The chapel recalls both the Pantheon in Rome, with its central oculus, and the Villa Capra "La Rotonda" in Vicenza by Andrea Palladio. The entrance has a classical portico. The building is in a dilapidated state.

Sources
Translated from Italian Wikipedia.

Donato Florence
Donato Florence
Demidov family
Neoclassical architecture in Florence
Churches completed in 1831
Neoclassical church buildings in Italy